Omissus (Larus argentatus omissus)  is a variant of European herring gull. It is largely similar to a common herring gull, but unlike the common species, it has yellow legs.

There is very little research and documentation about the omissus variant, some authors believe that it may be a species of its own.

Omissus can be confused with the Yellow-legged gull, but the omissus does not have as distinctly bright yellow legs as the yellow-legged gull.

Omissus was first described in 1928 by the Russian ornithologist Theodor Pleske

References
 Omissus 1.
Omissus 2.
Avibase.
BirdForum.
Omissus in Scotland 1995.

External links
Link to scientific articles about Omissus.

European herring gull
Birds of Europe
Birds of Scandinavia
Scavengers
Birds described in 1928